The 1932 All-Ireland Junior Hurling Championship was the 15th staging of the All-Ireland Junior Championship since its establishment by the Gaelic Athletic Association in 1912.

Waterford entered the championship as the defending champions, however, they were beaten by Cork in the Munster first round.

The All-Ireland final was played on 30 October 1932 at Drogheda Park, between Dublin and London, in what was their first meeting in a final. Waterford won the match by 8-04 to 2-00 to claim their first ever championship title.

Results

All-Ireland Junior Hurling Championship

All-Ireland semi-finals

All-Ireland home final

All-Ireland final

References

Junior
All-Ireland Junior Hurling Championship